Vicki Barbara Poole is a New Zealand diplomat. In 2015 she was appointed the New Zealand ambassador to Timor-Leste.

Life
Poole has held the position of Deputy Director for Pacific Development in the Ministry of Foreign Affairs and Trade, and has served in the New Zealand delegation to the OECD in Paris.

References

Living people
Ambassadors of New Zealand
New Zealand women ambassadors
Year of birth missing (living people)
21st-century New Zealand women politicians